Frederick Joseph Fortune, Jr. (April 1, 1921 – April 20, 1994) is an American bobsledder who competed from the late 1940s to the mid-1960s. Competing in two Winter Olympics, he won the bronze medal in the two-man event at St. Moritz in 1948. Four years later he finished seventh in the two-man event at the 1952 Winter Olympics.

Fortune also won three bronze medals at the FIBT World Championships with two medals in two-man (1949, 1950) and one medal in four-man (1965).

In addition to bobsledding, Fred Fortune was a fine skier and he served during World War II in the 10th Mountain Division Ski Troops, during which time he earned a Bronze Star After the war, he returned to Lake Placid where he won the 1947 North American 2-man title with his Olympic partner, Sky Carron. Fortune’s occupation was as a contractor. He founded and built two towns – North Pole, New York and North Pole, Colorado (on Pikes Peak) – both Santa Claus Children's Villages.

References
Bobsleigh two-man Olympic medalists 1932-56 and since 1964
Bobsleigh two-man world championship medalists since 1931
Bobsleigh four-man world championship medalists since 1930
DatabaseOlympics.com profile

1921 births
1994 deaths
American male bobsledders
Bobsledders at the 1948 Winter Olympics
Bobsledders at the 1952 Winter Olympics
Olympic bronze medalists for the United States in bobsleigh
Medalists at the 1948 Winter Olympics